The 2000 Teen Choice Awards ceremony was held on August 6, 2000, at the Barker Hangar, Santa Monica, California. The awards celebrated the year's achievements in music, film, television, sports, fashion, comedy and the Internet, and were voted on by teen viewers aged 13 through 19. The event had no designated host but Freddie Prinze Jr. introduced the show with 98 Degrees, BBMak, No Doubt and Enrique Iglesias as performers.

Performers
98 Degrees – "Give Me Just One Night (Una Noche)"
BBMak – "Back Here"
No Doubt – "Simple Kind of Life"
Enrique Iglesias – "Be with You"

Presenters

98 Degrees
Aaliyah
Jessica Alba
Shiri Appleby
Jason Behr
Justin Berfield
Adam Carolla
Aaron Carter
Rachael Leigh Cook
Carson Daly
Majandra Delfino
Andy Dick
Dr. Dre
Brendan Fehr
Jamie Foxx
Bill Goldberg
Kathy Griffin
Hanson
Melissa Joan Hart
Katherine Heigl
Jennifer Love Hewitt
Hoku
Ricki Lake
Ananda Lewis
Christopher Masterson
Jeremy McGrath
Pink
Freddie Prinze Jr.
Keri Russell
Leelee Sobieski
Erik Per Sullivan
Michelle Trachtenberg
Usher
Vitamin C
Paul Walker
Michael Weatherly

Nominees
Winners are highlighted in bold text.

Movies

Television

Music

Miscellaneous

References

 

2000
2000 awards
2000 in American music
2000 in California
20th century in Los Angeles